Care work is a sub-category of work that includes all tasks that directly involve care processes done in service of others. It is often differentiated from other forms of work because it is considered to be intrinsically motivated. This perspective defines care labor as labor undertaken out of affection or a sense of responsibility for other people, with no expectation of immediate pecuniary reward. Regardless of motivation, care work includes care activities done for pay as well as those done without remuneration.

Care work refers to those occupations that provide services that help people develop their capabilities, or the ability to pursue the aspects of their lives that they value. Examples of these occupations include child care, all levels of teaching (from preschool through university professors), and health care of all types (nurses, doctors, physical therapists and psychologists). Care work also includes the array of domestic unpaid work that is often disproportionately performed by women.

Care work is frequently focused on the responsibility to provide for dependents, such as children, the sick, and the elderly. However, care work also refers to any work done in the immediate service of others, regardless of the recipient's dependent or non-dependent status, and can even extend to "animals and things."

The study of care work is closely linked with the fields of feminist economics and feminist legal theory, and is associated with scholars including Marilyn Waring, Nancy Folbre, Martha Albertson Fineman, Paula England, Maria Floro, Diane Elson, Caren Grown and Virginia Held.

Importance

The products of care work are essential to human well-being. Without genuine care and nurturing, it is thought that children cannot develop into high-functioning individuals, and adults have a hard time maintaining or expanding their well-being and productivity. Actively involved childcare, whether provided in the home, by the public sector or by the private sector, contributes to the development of healthy and productive children. Effective care for the sick allows recipients to remain productive and continue contributing to society. In this sense, care work is directly related to the functioning of a society as well as to the economic development of that society in that well-cared for people can more effectively contribute to the market. Care work is responsible for creating both social capital and human capital.

Caring for others is often costly, which is why care work is associated with the “care penalty.” This penalty is so named because a person's work caring for others is often not compensated by any monetary means. It has been suggested that individuals who don't take care of others—especially the next generation—will not be capable of reproducing themselves. The implication is that the receipt of care is often necessary for individuals to reach the stage of life where they can go on to care for others. This argument suggests that care is necessary for the development of human life and, on a larger scale, for functional societies. The target of teaching individuals to care for others may lead to forms of distributional struggle, particularly along gender lines.

A popular belief in economics is that the household sector is a wealth spender rather than a wealth creator, although many argue that the household sector plays a very important role in wealth creation. Unlike the business sector, the wealth created by the household sector is not financial wealth, which is unsurprising in that much of the work done in the household sector is unpaid. The resulting wealth falls into the category of social wealth because the care work that parents perform in raising a child increases that child's ability to perform in society later. As a whole, the individuals who benefit from having received care perform better in academic and social settings, enabling them to create financial wealth later in life and to play a part in increasing social capital.

Sabine O’Hara offers an expanded concept of the role of care in the economy, arguing that not only people, but "everything needs care." Foregrounding what is often treated as "context" and highlighting the sustaining nature of care services offered out with the formal economy, she sees care as the basis of market economies.

Who does care work?

Family and community
Before the Industrial Revolution, care work (such as taking care of the household and raising children) was done by the entire family, and often involved the contributions of an entire community. In this sense, the core sphere was not seen as separate from daily business interactions, because the idea of the market did not yet exist as it does today.

The effects of industrialization 
With the dawn of the Industrial Era, the core sphere became more separate from jobs and business, which were performed outside and away from the home. Largely as a product of patriarchal societies, men became the ones who left the home to do their work in factories and other non-domestic jobs. Women, who were considered better suited to nurturing, were left at home and expected to provide childcare and do the housework. This familial hierarchy persisted and has continued to show itself in the contemporary American family, with a breadwinner father, a homemaker mother, and their children. However, not all families were structured as such. Contrary to White women, Black women and women of color were expected to work. Almost 80 percent of single black women compared to 23.8 percent of single white women worked in 1880. Despite the typical declining rates of labor participation after marriage among white women, labor force participation remained stable for black women. Thus, both black men and women financially contributed to the household.

Domestic work arose as an important element in caring and maintaining a stable workforce. With the abolition of slavery in the U.S., African American women were increasingly hired as domestic workers. The history of domestic work in the United States is one of gender, racial, citizenship, and class hierarchies. Despite domestic work being a paid job, it was not recognized as real work by either the law or society. Because domestic work lies within the private sphere and is typically performed by women, it was often depicted as an “act of love” or rewarding in itself. This mentality has served as a justification for the lack of legal protections in this area of work that exist even today, such as in the exclusion of domestic workers from the National Labor Relations Act, guaranteeing the right to form labor unions. Similarly, “live-in” workers such as “live-in” nannies and housekeepers are still not provided overtime protections under the Fair Labor Standards Act. Whether women worked or stayed in the home, their duties were believed to be unimportant and were largely ignored.

This issue persists today in the field of economics. Acts performed in the home often carry considerable replacement costs but are not factored into productivity.  It is possible to pay others to perform many of the tasks associated with care work, but to do so is often prohibitively expensive.  When adding up the potential costs of work such as round-the-clock childcare, housekeeping, cooking, and the cost of a person such as a home health aide to provide care for elderly family members, it proves much more cost effective for families to substitute their time rather than pay the replacement cost.  While paid care work is considered employment, work undertaken by family members is not counted as productive towards the economic market and is therefore overlooked when considering things such as employment status.

Despite persisting complications regarding the perception of care work, the economic environment has changed from what it was a century ago. Many more women now participate in the labor force at least part-time, and many more believe that the "cult of domesticity" for women of the 19th and 20th centuries is a thing of the past. However, studies show that women have come to dominate caring professions - such as teaching, childcare, nursing, social work - and that most of these professions are paid considerably less than the occupations more frequently held by men. To add to this, women frequently are still expected to do the housework and to raise the children in many families. The persisting idea that care work is unimportant combined with these factors explains why care work continues to be ignored from an economic point of view, and why women still have a difficult time shirking gender roles.

Women and unpaid care work
Many studies have shown that women provide the majority of unpaid childcare, while some have shown men to be more likely to support the elderly than to care for children. The comparative willingness of women to perform unpaid care work has historically contributed to the poor compensation received by people in care-based professions.  The historical and cultural pressure on women to provide these services without assurance of financial compensation has devalued care work, leading to these professions being heavily underpaid in comparison to professions which require a similar amount of training and work but are not equivalent to any domestically performed tasks.

Women also carry a heavier burden of care work in the home in comparison to men.  This is largely due to differences in gender socialization as well as historical and cultural traditions. The biological differences explain that women show more affection and love in performing care work when compared with men. As they are growing up, women are taught to be more caring and affectionate in their behavior, compared to their male counterparts. This does not imply however that women are more biologically predisposed to do care work. Historical and cultural traditions explain the widely held ideology of women's role in caring for others. In Nepal women work 21 more hours each week than men, and in India, 12 more hours. In Kenya 8- to 14-year-old girls spend 5 hours more on household chores than boys. In all these cases most of these extra work hours for women are spent on care work. This poses a particular problem for women in that these extra hours of domestic care work translate into a difficult balance for women between market work and domestic work. Since the division of household labor women have not been given many choices other than care work as patriarchal systems have used their physical force, property rights, and cultural norms to force women to take over specializations that are deemed unfit for men.

The creation of separate spheres, public and private, in the nineteenth century contributed to the belief that caring was incompatible with the workplace and belonged to the family only. The historical push of women into care work combined with the contemporary dominance of women in these fields, accounts for the modern conceptions that care work is inherently feminine work. However, care work is not naturally feminized. Instead, care work is only socialized into a feminine sphere, and is also done by males. Despite the social nature of the feminization of care work, it has become so feminized that there is often a stigma against men who engage in care work. This stigma may discourage men from entering care work as well as further propagate the belief that care work is inherently women's work. Moreover, the conflation of women's work and care work can lead to the ignoring of cultural, political, racial, and ethnic differences among women.

Furthermore, there are many differences in earning between high school graduates and college graduates. This difference is especially pertinent between male and female individuals searching for a job. If unemployed, the differences between the rates of high school graduates and college graduates may even be similar. However, women tend to find more opportunities in unpaid care work if they are unable to get into the paid work force. If individuals are unable to achieve a degree, they will not meet the threshold of what many jobs require. This inevitability is felt by much of the world population who are unable to attend school due to staying in their household to take care of elderly or sick family members.

Recently, individual people are not the only ones who claim to provide care. An increasing number of companies are claiming that they will care for you in order to attract you into purchasing their services. For example, Lufthansa, an airline company, had an advertisement that read, "Service as dependable as a shoulder to lean on." The accompanying picture displayed a woman leaning her head on a man's shoulder, with both sound asleep. In this case, the take-away message seems to be that a high degree of care translates into high quality. Another airline company, British Airways, had an ad that displayed the same message. It read, "New Club World cradle seat. Lullaby not included." The image accompanying the statement showed a woman caring for a baby in her arms. The baby's head, however, was switched with that of a relaxed and content passenger. These are only a few of the companies that are now promoting themselves as care-oriented in order to gain customers.

Division by socio-economic class
Most paid care work is performed by members of the working class, predominantly women of the working class. Most of the paid work that members of the working class perform is care work. The domestic workforce, for example, is composed of approximately 2.2 million workers in the U.S., out of which a large majority (91.5%) are women. Half of these identify as Black, Hispanic, or Asian American Pacific Islander. Black and Hispanic women are particularly overrepresented in the domestic workforce. About 35% of domestic workers were not born in the U.S., thus this particular workforce is composed of a large proportion of immigrant women of color. Scholars have described this phenomenon as the ‘international division of reproductive labor’ or ‘care chain’. In this ‘chain’, housework is commodified. Those women who can afford it pay other women, usually immigrant women of color, to do their housework. Back in their home country, other women perform their housework for them.  Care work does not necessarily have to be face-to-face. Scholar Hung Cam Thai, for instance, in his study of Vietnamese transnational marriages suggests that migrant remittances can be considered a form of care work as well.

Baumol Effect

Caring for others has sparked a lot of controversy as the market prices of items that are required for care increase and just as many care opportunities continue to be non-paid. The costs are increasing and the relative rise of price for the services is not providing any substitutes; this is known as the Baumol Effect. William Baumol and William Bowen describe the Baumol Effect as when there is a relative rise of price of services without substitutes. For example, the costs of childcare and sending children to college have become notably higher than in recent years. To further the pressure on caregivers, elderly lives are increasing and there are fewer siblings to share elder care responsibilities as there were, for example, during the baby boom. However, one issue to note about this effect is people taking advantage of others due to rising costs of items needed for care. The Nice Person's Dilemma is a risk that opportunists will take when they seize advantage of those who are generous and cooperative. If the Baumol effect occurs, many will take advantage of these “Nice Persons” and act as if they will pay them back, but never do because of the higher prices. This dilemma proves why individuals are unable to make any change in community care. It takes whole communities to commit this change in order for the communities to gain from provided care and make sure that people do not cheat the system through the Nice Person's Dilemma.

Care work and the market

Today, there are four parts of the economy: Business, Household, Public, and Non-profit. Typically, we only think that the business sector creates any wealth, and that the other three serve the business sector and alongside it. The truth is that all four parts of the economy generate wealth, and that wealth flows over into other sections of the economy as well. Part of the reason that unpaid care work is largely ignored is because of this belief that the household does not form wealth. In reality, the household prepares children for the other parts of the economy, and without that, none of the other sectors would flourish.

Historically care work has largely been associated with domestic unpaid work, yet with the growth and changing nature of the market, care work is occurring more frequently in the paid sphere than it has in the past. This shift has dramatic implications on both care work itself and on society as a whole. As care work is increasingly marketized there is a possibility that those that need care—the sick, the elderly and children—will not be able to afford the care they need. Another concern is that the quality of care may decrease in response to the call for profit-making and efficiency.

As a consequence of these and other concerns, this marketization of care work is under much public and academic scrutiny. These discussions focus on an array of issues including explanations for the endemic low-pay of care work, the effects of the market on the quality of care work, and the implications of the market on care workers themselves. Five particularly prominent theories of care work including devaluation theory, public good theory, prisoner of love theory, commoditization of love theory and love and money theory are frameworks by which academics study and explain these phenomena. Each of these theories examines care work in relation to the market.

Devaluation theory 

Devaluation theory seeks to explain the low-wages that are typical of care work by focusing on the fact that many care workers are women and that gender-based biases remain in societies. In short, devaluation theory asserts that decision makers under- estimate the contribution of female dominated jobs to organizational goals, including profits, and therefore underpay these workers.

The devaluation theory is supported by sociological studies. In 2002, sociologist Paula England conducted a studying that revealed, even after controlling for skill demands, educational requirements, industry, and sex composition, a net penalty of 5%–10% for working in an occupation involving care was found (one exception was nursing, which did not seem to experience the pay penalty of other care work). Overall, the evidence suggests that care work pays less than would be expected, given its educational and other requirements. However, it is not necessarily clear that this relation is caused by discriminatory factors, although it is a likely explanatory factor.

Public good theory

Care work has a multitude of indirect social benefits that associate it with a specific type of good known as a public goods; goods that have benefits that are impossible to deny to those who have not paid for them. Education, an example of care work, is a classic example of a public good. Care work is unique in the category of public goods, however, in that receiving care also helps recipients develop skills, values, and habits that benefit themselves and others. In short, care work, by developing peoples internal capacities, imbues them with future abilities to contribute to society in the form of a public good.

This theory may explain the low-wages characteristic of care work. The standard economic argument is that public goods will be underprovided by markets because there is no way to capture and turn into profits benefits that come through social interaction.

Prisoner of love theory

Care work has been defined as work that provides services based on sustained personal interaction, and is motivated (at least in part) by concern about the recipient's welfare. This understanding of care work has distinct effects both on the nature and wages of care work. If care workers are actually motivated by an intrinsic value for the work which they do, then economic theory asserts that they will tolerate lower wages for their work. In this sense, the low-wages of care work may be explained. Further, the connection that these workers feel to their work puts them in a poor bargaining position. For example, nurses may be reluctant to strike because a strike would negatively affect their patients whom they care about.

Commoditization of emotion theory

Commoditization of emotion theory focuses on the effects of marketized care work on the care workers’ personal experiences and individual well-being. The commoditization of emotion theory asserts that many jobs in the new service economy require workers to act emotions they do not really feel and that this process is harmful to workers. For example, the commoditization of childcare may be overly emotionally exhausting on childcare workers due to the conflict between the natural emotions of this job and these workers’ need for pay. Arlie Russell Hochschild explores this theory in The Managed Heart.

“Love and Money” theory 

The “Love and Money” theory attempts to reconcile the perceived divide between work done for intrinsic motivation and work done for pay. Theorists assert that because male and female are seen as opposite, and because gender schema organize so much of our thinking, we develop a dualistic view that “women, love, altruism, and the family are, as a group, radically separate and opposite from men, self-interested rationality, work, and market exchange.” This belief has led to the idea that care work should not be done for pay because pay will undermine the intrinsic motivations for this work. However, studies have shown that these divides may not be so stark. Instead, it has been found that acknowledging rewards send the message that the recipient is trusted, respected, and appreciated These results suggest that the more that pay is combined with trust and appreciation, the less it drives out genuine intrinsic motivation—especially important in care work. As a result, theorists argue that the central problem with care work is under-demand and that care work should be better compensated by the market.

Care work and public policy 

The debate surrounding care work has specific policy implications ranging from issues of market structure, work environments, incentive schemes, regulatory requirements, adequate financial support for care. A second major policy area relating to care work involves the question of gender analysis in economic policy.

Accounting for unremunerated care
For example, The Unremunerated Work Act of 1993 would require the Bureau of Labor Statistics to conduct surveys that would measure unpaid labor and include these measures in the GDP. This bill was supported by many but not all feminist economists. Critics argue that this bill would romanticize care work and propagate gender biases in the field. Other critics argue that care work can be performed more efficiently outside the home. Finally, some critics believe that this would create a move for care givers to value efficiency over affection, quantity and quality.

Accounting for time spent in unpaid care is extremely difficult because it is often an emotionally involved activity that isn't always reported as singular activities. This becomes even more difficult because there is a "social desirability" bias. For example, husbands will often report more time spent devoted to care work than their wives would report for them, and vice versa. People do this because providing care is considered praiseworthy. Thus, it is hard to make a survey that can get accurate results. However, most of the problems can be minimized through the use of a time diary. This method involves respondents describing the activities that they performed during the previous day. The responses are then standardized for analysis purposes. For example, "eating sandwich" and "drinking juice" would both be considered as "eating."

Women in 32 countries provide an estimated annual $1.5 trillion in health care, according to a study published in The Lancet, a leading medical journal. If unpaid care work performed by women were compensated at even just minimum wage around the world, this would boost measured global economic output by $12 trillion, which is 11% of global economic output and is equivalent to the annual economic output of China, according to a study the McKinsey Global Institute.

Care work wage parity
A second policy relating to care work is the push for higher wages in the sphere of paid care work. Advocates of this policy believe that individuals who respect and fulfill norms of care will be seen as losers in the competitive economic game, if wages are not increased. Due to this stigma, some economists argue that there may be a gradual erosion of the supply of unpaid care services in the system. Therefore, in order to encourage care work, these proponents advocate for higher wages for care work. However, not all feminist economists believe that higher wages would be appropriate for care work. For example, those who ascribe to the commoditization of emotion framework argue that higher wages may push out true caring emotions in care workers.

Care work and gender
A third policy debate surrounding care work involves the feminization of care work and focuses on an attempt to make care work more gender neutral, or at least, less disproportionately burdensome to women. One model set forth to address these disparities is the ‘‘universal-breadwinner model’’ which aims at achieving equity through women's employment and parity with men. The ‘‘caregiver- parity model’’ promotes increased support for informal care work and on forms of employment for women, such as part-time employment, that would increase their time available to provide domestic care work. The first model shifts care and reproductive work to the market and the state, whereas the second keeps care work within the household with support from public funds. Yet both models, to an extent, lift the burden of care work off of women and transfer it either toward the state or toward men.

Another model is Shared Earning/Shared Parenting Marriage, which involves not transfer payments from taxpayers to women for women to do the care work, but men actually taking responsibility for half the care work themselves, and women taking half the financial responsibility of basic needs of the family.  The fact that paternity is now inexpensively provable is used to support recognition of this model.  This model is also focused on improving the experience of children and removing developmental distortions from the feminization of care, such as those that arise from symbiotic mothering or paternal neglect trauma.

A meta analysis by Jenny Young et al. from 2020 found that research on care work is under-reporting male care workers, such that the experience of men is understood less well. Previously in 1989, Sara Arber et al. referred to men as "the forgotten carers" and found that they have a larger share of care work than is often recognized.

Care work and gender analysis in economic policy 
Care work, in that it is disproportionally done by women and is also often unpaid, highlights the importance of the larger issue of considering gender in economic policy. As a result, many economists argue that gender analysis should be an essential part in the consideration of any economic policy.

Care work and economic policy across the world
Care work is a universal force, but it is manifested differently across the world due to differences in a number of factors including the availability of domestic service, the extent of the informal economy, and international migration. For this reason, economists argue that there are differences between Northern and Southern countries that would influence the effectiveness of certain policies in the South. Public policies suggested for these regions include increased availability of day care centers, greater access to schools, greater access to health care, improved public transportation, increased access to telephones and more.

Care penalty 

Care penalty is the term for the sacrifices one makes when performing care work. Nancy Folbre describes the term care penalty in depth in her book The Invisible Heart. Care penalties can refer to an array of sacrifices, whether it's a loss of personal time, money, or experiences missed out on while providing care. The care work in question can be provided to children, animals, the elderly, the sick, the mentally challenged, the learning incapable, and others of like disability. Providing care work limits a person's ability to compete with those who don't have to provide such care. For example, say a single woman with the responsibility of a child is in the cards for a job promotion, but so is a single, childless woman. There is a high chance the company will take this into account and give the job to the woman who isn't tied down to a child, because she likely has far more time to devote to the position.

Folbre points out that the concept of the care penalty leads to distributional struggles extremely relevant to gender roles (see 5.3). In situations like the Good Parent's Dilemma, this is made known. When two people choose to have a child, in most cases, one parent is forced to sacrifice far more than the other, so that the other can work and provide for the family. A vast majority of the time, the parent that ends up staying home and caring for the children is the mother. According to the U.S. Census Bureau report of 2012, there were only 189,000 homes run by stay-at-home dads, compared to 5,091,000 homes run by stay-at-home moms, meaning that roughly 4,902,000 more women are paying care penalties than men. When women make this sacrifice, it not only affects them in the moment, but it affects them even after the child is capable of being independent. By taking time off from their careers, these women are at a disadvantage in the work force for years to come.

This long-term decline in earnings is referred to by Folbre as the “Family Gap or Motherhood Gap.”  This reduction in compensation is not attributable to working fewer hours. Rather, mothers with families often are passed for advancement opportunities such as the promotion scenario described above. The motherhood penalty has been increasing in part due to increased parity of pay for men and women. In 1991 it was estimated that the “motherhood gap” accounted for 60% of the difference between men's and women's compensation. Additionally, tends to be more severe for women with higher levels of education.

Parenthood is seemingly the type of care work that evokes the most significant, and most common, care penalty. Since the mere cost in dollars of raising a child increases constantly, the sacrifices one has to make to raise children are increasing at the same rate. The amount of money parents give up to their children is only money they are taking away from themselves; this is an extreme care penalty. Separate from the issue of money, children tend to cause parents to make many other sacrifices. Being responsible for a child can dictate a person's decisions on where to live, what to do in their free time, and what jobs to take. There are opportunities that are necessary to turn down when one is held accountable for another person's well-being, which is the perfect definition of the care penalty.

Although parenthood may be the most common source of the care penalty, elder care also imposes costs upon the caregiver. Unlike parenthood which entails choice to some extent, an individual cannot choose whether to have elderly members of a family such as parents. Caring for elders is not legally required of a son or daughter in the same way that parents are legally bound to care for their children. There is a societal expectation, however, that adult children will provide care for their parents. In addition to societal expectations, research shows that an expectation of inheritance does have an effect on the behavior of adult children.

The care penalty suffered by caregivers of the elderly can be just as costly as the care penalty endured by parents of young children. The penalties can be both emotional and economic. Research has shown that over 60% of caregivers for the elderly experienced some depression. With regard to economic consequences, Brandeis University research demonstrated that approximately 66% of caregivers lost out on career opportunities such as training in due to care obligations. Similarly to the childcare, the caregivers for the elderly are largely female. The burden of eldercare is expected to increase due to shifting demographics which render the elderly an increasing percentage of the population. The number of persons over the 85 is expected to increase especially and this group often requires high levels of care.

The care penalty is commonly a necessary evil. If someone is in need of supervision, there are not many options to give him or her the care they require. If a person didn't want to or for some reason could not care for this person on their own, the only other course of action would be to pay someone else to provide them with the care they need. This is sometimes impossible, since professional care can be extremely costly and can seem inefficient. With professional care there also comes moral issues; it's likely that a person wouldn't trust a stranger to care for someone they love, and would find more peace of mind in taking on the responsibility themselves. For this reason, some victims of the care penalty have actually chosen the position, though they are aware of the sacrifices that come with it.

The Care penalty to some degree is shaped by public policy. In the United States, the Family Medical Leave Act provides that mothers are entitled to 24 weeks of leave and must be permitted to return to their same position. The Family Medical Leave Act, however, only provides for unpaid leave and it does not address long-term reduction in earnings or career advancement.   Additionally the prevalence of part-time employment often influences the severity of the care penalty. For example, the care penalty is more severe in the United Kingdom since part-time employment is more common.

Many benefits arise when parents raise successful children. Not only do the children themselves benefit, but employers benefit from new, productive employees. Also, the elderly benefit from the Social Security taxes paid by the younger generations. Parents benefit because of reciprocity, with the child in the care-giving role and the parents in the care-receiving role. These positive externalities make it hard for those who provide the care services to charge a price that would reflect the true value of their services. Thus, the care penalty exists to this day.

Explanations for the overspecialization of women in care work 

Theories of evolutionary biology explain females’ investment in care as rational response to ensure the benefits of their investment (i.e. the maturity of their pregnancy and child). On the other hand, men simply need to diversify their opportunities, by distributing their seed widely enough, to ensure their genes are cared for and carried forth by invested females. Institutional economics responds to this framework by emphasizing how these analyses ignore the power of social institutions that exaggerate biologically explained male power, including brute strength and freedom from childbearing and child rearing activities. The social arrangements perpetuated by these institutions are deemed to be internalized as individual preferences. Women's “overspecialization” in child rearing is understood has an outgrowth of the institution of patriarchy, rather than an absolutely biologically determined phenomenon.

Gerda Learner's research on the history of women has identified patriarchy, men's control over women, as a human-devised social institution dating back to the Bronze Age. Learner argues that the “production of the idea system” itself, including our recorded history, was constructed within and therefore imbued with the patriarchal system that under-emphasizes women's contributions to public society. Learner asserts that this misrepresentation of women in history not only underemphasizes women's role outside of domestic work, but also works to dampen future women's ambitions outside of the home, thereby reinforcing this misrepresentation.

Institutionalized male dominance (patriarchy) has not only excluded women from written history, but also worked to limit their political representation, education and property rights. There are distinct examples of United States law and public policies that have reinforced the patriarchal structure. Until the 19th constitutional amendment provided women the right to vote, women's interests were deemed to be represented through men's political participation. Further, women only began to secure property rights on a state by state basis after the civil war and still women continued to lack any legal claim to their husband's income at this time.

Institutionalized patriarchy has worked to limit women's agency in the public sector by concentrating political and economic power in men. cite Gary Becker's Rotten Kid Theorem as a disruption to the idea that a woman's interests can be adequately represented by their husband. If individual family members consistently acted in the collective interest of the entire unit, it would be in the interest of individual family members to act in coordination with the family, which is not always the case as demonstrated by children's rebellion. This recognition of what Braunstein & Folbre (2001) term the “non-benevolent patriarch” debunks the idea that women can be adequately represented by a single head of household and contend that families represent a myriad of interests that are not always manifested in one member's actions.

Braunstein & Folbre assert that the hierarchical relationship produced from the patriarchal system over allocates care work to women. Understanding that economic resources translate to increased bargaining power, Braunstein & Folbre contend that men (who historically control the resources) encourage women's specialization in care work in order to limit their economic activity, thereby limiting women's bargaining power, in an effort to preserve their own authority. Therefore, the individual controlling the influx of financial resources is seen as more profoundly interested in preserving their control and power, than in preserving the well-being of the entire family. In fact, Braunstein & Folbre demonstrate that more egalitarian families, where men and women are holding comparable economic resources, distribute care work more efficiently that patriarchy structures that have asymmetrical concentrations of power.

Modern public policy can be interpreted as covertly enforcing patriarchy by discriminating against single parent households and encouraging the patriarchal family structure that relies on a primary income earner and an unpaid care laborer. For example, the welfare law Personal Responsibility and Work Opportunity Reconciliation Act of 1996 cites among its goals to end pregnancy out of marriage and to promote two parent households. In addition, United States tax law imposes a lower tax rate on families that have earners with a wide income disparity than the rate applied to families with adults earning a similar income.

See also
 Reproductive labor
 Shared Earning/Shared Parenting Marriage 
 Work-Family Balance in the United States

References

Feminist economics
Gendered occupations
Caregiving
Unpaid work